Whitewater Creek is a stream in the U.S. state of Georgia. It is a tributary to the Flint River.

The name sometimes is spelled out as "White Water Creek". "Whitewater" is an accurate preservation of its native American Indian name Okauhutkee.

References

Rivers of Georgia (U.S. state)
Rivers of Macon County, Georgia
Rivers of Taylor County, Georgia